Jean-Claude Sensemat (born 1951 in Fleurance in the Gers) is a businessman in France.

Career
From 1970 to 2000, he founded and directed an import/export group of hand and power tool companies that bears his name. The Groupe Sensemat became the largest private employer of the Gers with over 500 collaborators in 1999 and sales totaling 800 million French francs (122 M Euros). 
The company’s growth is owed to the globalization of trade. As early as 1975, import-export operations were organized with India, China, Romania, Albania and other countries of the Eastern bloc, sometimes using barter and compensation. The Groupe Sensemat became a privileged supplier of the European major hypermarket retailers.
Through his tool-manufacturing group, he then acquired many brownfields in the department of the Gers (the Grundig Factory, the Seita buildings, etc.).

As a major player in the department’s economic life, he was a counselor with the Gers’ Bank of France for 6 years. He was Vice President of the Gers’ Employers' Union in 1989, and he founded the Gers’ UNICEF committee in 1988. He also founded a local newspaper: "La Gascogne".

In 1990, he purchased LIP, the renowned watchmaking company that was then in difficulty, and relaunched it. Then, in 1992 he acquired other brands: Achille Zavatta, Teppaz, and Luis Ocaña. In 2000, his strongly coveted hand and power tool group faced problems leading to the lifetime dismissal of a court administrator who was found guilty and imprisoned. The Sensemat Group disappeared.

In 2002, he transferred the LIP brand international license to the Gersoise company MGH of Lectoure. That same year, he was named Honorary Consul of the Republic of Albania for thirty-three French departments. He conducted his business from his company based in Toulouse.

In 2007, he immigrated to Canada with his family. He was received by the Canadian government as a Business Immigrant (Investor).  In Montreal he founded Gestion Geneen Inc., a business and wealth management company.

In 2013, he created the Editions Duroi in Quebec, Canada.

In 2016, the French businessman, Canadian citizen since 2015, sells the LIP brand to its licensee Jean-Luc Bernerd, President of JLB Brand.

In Canada, together with Gestion Geneen Inc., Family Office of the Sensemat family, he develops and manages his luxury condominium portfolio and trades his financial assets on the Wall Street Stock Exchange and the Toronto TSX.

External links
official website : http://www.sensemat.com

Publications
 La Patronade, éditions Olivier Orban, 1988.
 Un Moment de Gascogne, éditions La Gascogne, 1997.
 Le Délit d'Entreprendre, éditions de la Mezzanine, 2004.
 Comment j'ai sauvé LIP, éditions Entreprendre Robert Lafont, 2005.
 France you betrayed me, éditions Duroi, 2013

References

Histoire de Lip Site historique
''La vente de la marque LIP La cession de LIPL'annonce de la vente de LIP source
Article de la Dépêche article published on 2015-06-16 
''Article de la Dépêche , article published on 2016-01-22Article de la Dépêche , Fleurance. Jean-Claude Sensemat : «Je n'avais qu'une solution, partir», article published on 2016-08-22
''Article de VuDailleurs''' , PORTRAIT : QUI EST JEAN-CLAUDE SENSEMAT? , article published on 2021-01-12

French businesspeople
Living people
1951 births